Rudd's New Selection is a 1921 Australian silent film directed by Raymond Longford based on the Dad and Dave stories by Steele Rudd. It is a sequel to On Our Selection (1920). The plot concerns the marriage of Dave Rudd (Tal Ordell) and introduces a sister, Nell (Lottie Lyell).

Although popular on release, the movie is now considered lost.

Synopsis
The movie is set eight years after the events of On Our Selection. The Rudd family are now more prosperous, but Dad is as autocratic as ever. His children are grown up and the baby twins are up to mischief Dave is married and tries to do as little work as possible, but is forced to do so by his wife and domineering mother.

Dave's sister Nell is pursued by the Regan brothers, the younger of whom, Jim, was a decorated returned soldier, the elder, Jack, a drunkard. The two brothers fight over Nell and Jack commits suicide. Jim is arrested for his murder but the truth comes out at the end and he and Nell are married.

There are other comic subplots, including one where Mr Dandelioon, a prohibitionist candidate for parliament, visits the Rudds and Joe laces his tea with rum.

Cast
J.P. O'Neill as Dad Rudd
Ada Clyde as Mum
Tal Ordell as Dave Rudd
Lottie Lyell as Nell
Charlotte Beaumont as Sarah
Gilbert Emery as Mr Dandelion
Louis Fors as Joe
Billy Williams as Jack Regan
Ernest T Hearn as Jim Regan
Dick Varley as storekeeper
Clyde Marsh as Trooper Brady
May Renne as Lily
William Coulter as Grogan
Ada St Claire as Mrs Banks
Meadow Peel as Matilda
Anne Parsons as Mrs McFluster

Production
Shooting began in late 1920 on location in the Megalong Valley, with interiors shot in the Carrolls' Studio at Waverly. The romantic male lead was Ernest Hearne, an ex-soldier from Queensland.

Rudall Hayward worked on the film as an assistant.

Reception
Reviews were good.

Box Office
Steele Rudd later claimed the film earned £2345 in one cinema alone, from which the producers earned £519. This sort of return helped disillusion him with the film industry.

See also
List of lost films

References

External links

Rudd's New Selection at National Film and Sound Archive
Rudd's New Selection at SilentEra

1921 films
Australian drama films
Australian silent feature films
Australian black-and-white films
Films directed by Raymond Longford
Films based on works by Steele Rudd
Lost Australian films
1921 drama films
1921 lost films
Lost drama films
Silent drama films